Zaurbek Olegovich Olisayev (born 2 February 1994) is a Russian-Ossetian professional football player. He plays for SSh 75 Moscow.

Club career
He made his debut for the senior squad of FC Alania Vladikavkaz in the 2012–13 Russian Cup game against FC Tyumen on 27 September 2012.

References

External links
 
 
 Player page by sportbox.ru

1994 births
Sportspeople from Vladikavkaz
Living people
Russian footballers
Association football midfielders
FC Spartak Vladikavkaz players
FC Armavir players
FC Dacia Chișinău players
FC Neftekhimik Nizhnekamsk players
Moldovan Super Liga players
Russian expatriate footballers
Expatriate footballers in Moldova